The eighth season of Bulgarian reality singing competition The Voice of Bulgaria premiered on 12 September 2021 and broadcasts every 20:00, at bTV. For this season, Ivan Lechev returned for his coaching duties for the fifth time, and three new coaches were announced, who include Lubo Kirov, Galena, and Dara who will replace Grafa Ampov, Kamelia and Mihaela Fileva.

Petya Paneva was crowned The Voice of Bulgaria, marking Galena’s first win as a coach. This is the third time that a first-time coach wins their first season (first being Desi Slava on season three, and then Ivan Lechev on season four). The top two, Petya Paneva and Georgi Kostadinov, were both from Galena’s team, marking the first time this has happened in any season. This was also the first time where the first contestant to audition went on winning the season.

Coaches and host 

In June 2021, bTV announced the return of the musical competition show with the new coaches. Dara, Galena, and Lubo Kirov were announced to be the new coaches of the show, replacing Mihaela Fileva, who coached for two seasons, Kamelia and Grafa, both coaching for four seasons. Meanwhile, Ivan Lechev returned to his coaching duties for the fifth consecutive season. Kamelia was supposed to return for her fifth time as a coach but opted not to return on the show.

After the announcement of new coaches, Ivan Tishev takes the hosting responsibility. He will replace Pavell and Venci Venc' who were hosts on the series from 2017 until 2020. Also Alexandra Bogdanska served as backstage host for second year.

Production 
The filming of The Voice of Bulgaria started on July, at bTV studios. Unilke previous seasons, audiences are reduced from its full capacity to maintain social distancing as a result of COVID-19 pandemic.

Teams 

  Winner
  Runner-up
  Third place
  Fourth place
  Fifth place
  Sixth place
  Eliminated in the Live Cross Battles
  Eliminated in the Knockouts
  Stolen in the Battles
  Eliminated in the Battles
  Eliminated in the Final selection
  Withdrew

Blind auditions 
In this season, coaches complete their teams without a specific number of members. However, each one will be cut down to 14 contestants, on the last episode of the blinds. In addition to the season, each coach is given two blocks to use during the auditions.

The Final selection follows right after the blind auditions. Coaches would finalize the number of artists on their team by choosing, randomly, 14 artists to proceed to the next stage. Artists chosen by their respective coach will proceed to the next round, the Battles, while the unselected ones will be eliminated.

Episode 1 (September 12)

Episode 2 (September 19)

Episode 3 (September 26)

Episode 4 (October 3)

Episode 5 (October 10)

Episode 6 (October 17)

Episode 7 (October 24)

Battles 
The battles round begin airing on October 31. The battle advisers for this season are the following: Maria Ilieva for Team Lubo, season 3 coach Atanas Penev for Team Ivan, Doni for Team Dara, Medi and Georgi Simeonov for Team Galena.

Each coach is entitled to one "steal" throughout the battles (as in season 6) to save a losing contestant. At the end of the battles, eight contestants (seven winning and one stolen artists) will remain on each team, advancing through to the Knockouts.

Knockouts 
The Knockouts round begins airing on November 21. Ishtar is the Mega mentor for all teams in this phase. Each team has a total of eight contestants, and three will be chosen by their coach to go through to the Live shows. During this round, Galena has only seven artists to perform due to Galya Georgieva's withdrawal from the show.

Live shows

Episode 13: Cross Battles (December 5) 
Cross Battles were broadcast on December 5. In this round, an artist would be sent by his or her coach to compete against an artist from another team. The selection of the artists and their order of appearance were all decided by their respective coaches, and all of them were done without the knowledge of the opposing coach. Therefore, the battle pairings were completely random, and would only be revealed when the coaches appeared with their selected artist on stage. This is the first time the Bulgarian version has had this phase.

As the Cross Battles are broadcast live the results of the battle will be determined by public vote in real-time. Public votes will be done only during the airing of the episode. After this round, six artists will be remaining to move on in the Grand Final. It is the first time the series has a final with six finalists.

With the elimination of Rashed, Ivanov, and Zdravkovic, Lubo Kirov no longer has any artists remaining on his team. For the first time in the show's history, a coach's team does not have any artists in the grand finale.

Episode 14: Final (December 12) 
The final was divided into three rounds. First, the six finalists performed with a guest, and then the sixth and fifth places were announced. In the second round, the four finalists remaining performed alone and the fourth and third places were, then, revealed. Finally, the Top 2 performed alone again, followed by the winner announcement.

Elimination chart 
Artist's info

  Team Ivan
  Team Dara
  Team Galena
  Team Lubo

Result details

  Winner
  Runner-up
  Third place
  Fourth place
  Fifth place
  Sixth place
  Saved by the public
  Eliminated

Contestants appeared on other television contest or previous seasons 

 Lidiya Ganeva - participated the 2016 Junior Eurovision Song Contest, ended up as the 9th placer
 Kieron Smith - participated on the eighth season of The Voice UK. He was part of team JHud and eliminated in the Battle Rounds.

References 

2021 Bulgarian television seasons
Bulgaria
Bulgarian television series
Bulgarian-language television shows